The 1952 Iowa gubernatorial election was held on November 4, 1952. Incumbent Republican William S. Beardsley defeated Democratic nominee Herschel C. Loveless with 51.90% of the vote.

Primary elections
Primary elections were held on June 2, 1952.

Democratic primary

Candidates
Herschel C. Loveless, Mayor of Ottumwa
Otha Wearin, former U.S. Representative

Results

Republican primary

Candidates
William S. Beardsley, incumbent Governor
Kenneth A. Evans, former Lieutenant Governor
William H. Nicholas, incumbent Lieutenant Governor

Results

General election

Candidates
Major party candidates
William S. Beardsley, Republican
Herschel C. Loveless, Democratic 

Other candidates
Z. Everett Kellum, Prohibition
Ernest J. Seemann, Independent

Results

References

1952
Iowa
Gubernatorial